This section of the list of former state routes in New York contains all routes numbered between 1 and 25.

References

 001